Richard Andrew John Townsley (born 24 June 1952 in Castleford, Yorkshire, England) is an English first-class cricketer,  who played two first-class matches for Yorkshire County Cricket Club in 1974 and 1975, and five List A one day matches in 1975.  Townsley also played for the Yorkshire Second XI from 1972 to 1975, and the Yorkshire Under-25s from 1972 to 1976.

A left-handed batsman, Townsley scored 22 first-class runs, with his best score being 12 against Sussex, at an average of 5.50, and he took one catch.  He scored 81 runs in one day games, with a best of 34 against Somerset.  A right arm medium bowler, he failed to take a wicket in either form of the game, conceding 62 runs in one day cricket.

References

External links
Cricinfo Profile

1952 births
Living people
Yorkshire cricketers
Cricketers from Castleford
English cricketers
Oxfordshire cricketers
English cricketers of 1969 to 2000